The Ontario 32 is a Canadian sailboat, that was designed by C&C Design and first built in 1974.

Production
The design was built by Ontario Yachts in Canada, between 1974 and 1986, with a total of 160 boats completed during its production run. The design is now out of production.

Design

The Ontario 32 is a recreational keelboat, built predominantly of fiberglass, with wood trim. It has a masthead sloop rig, a raked stem, a square transom, an internally-mounted spade-type rudder controlled by a wheel and a fixed long fin keel. It has distinctive Dorade box ventilators. It displaces  and carries  of ballast.

A tall mast version was also produced, with a mast about  higher than standard.

The tall mast version has a PHRF racing average handicap of 177 with a high of 185 and low of 176.

Operational history

In a review Michael McGoldrick wrote, "The Ontario 32 is a no-nonsense cruising boat with respectable performance, and it remains in high demand...The Ontario 32's popularity is in large part due to the fact that Ontario Yachts built these boats to very high standards and included many sought-after cruising features including, for example, dorade boxes for added ventilation, three burner stove with an oven, shoal draft, large chart table, 6' 4" of headroom"

See also

List of sailing boat types

Similar sailboats
Aloha 32
Bayfield 30/32
Beneteau 323
C&C 32
Columbia 32
Contest 32 CS
Douglas 32
Hunter 32 Vision
Hunter 326
Mirage 32
Morgan 32
Nonsuch 324
Ranger 32
Watkins 32

References

External links

Keelboats
1980s sailboat type designs
Sailing yachts
Sailboat type designs by C&C Design
Sailboat types built by Ontario Yachts